The 1908 Ohio gubernatorial election was held on November 3, 1908. Democratic nominee Judson Harmon defeated incumbent Republican Andrew L. Harris with 49.20% of the vote.

General election

Candidates
Major party candidates
Judson Harmon, Democratic
Andrew L. Harris, Republican 

Other candidates
Robert Bandlow, Socialist
John Kircher, Socialist Labor
John B. Martin, Prohibition
Andrew F. Otte, Independent

Results

References

1908
Ohio
Gubernatorial